Joshua Ward (1685–1761) was an English doctor, most remembered for the invention of Friar's Balsam. He sat briefly in the House of Commons from 1715 to 1717.

Life
Ward was born in Yorkshire. He was the brother of John Ward who was MP for several years. At the 1715 general election Ward was returned as Member of Parliament for Marlborough, through the artifice of one of the Mayors, but was unseated on petition in 1717.

Ward went to France where he practiced as a quack doctor but returned to London in 1734.  He invented a medicine called "Joshua Ward's drop", also known as the "Pill and Drop". It was supposed to cure people of any illness they had, gaining acclaim and notoriety for Ward. Ward is widely cited as an example of a quack. His pills which he claimed could cure any illness, are suspected of containing large amounts of antimony which is poisonous and could cause permanent liver damage. The pills were artificially coloured red, purple and blue. Historian Jeremy Black has noted that "his remedies killed as many as they cured."

A chemist Joseph Clutton published an analysis of Ward's pills in A True and Candid Relation of the Good and Bad Effects of Joshua Ward's Pill and Drop, 1736. He found that two of the pills contained antimony and cobalt and the other arsenic.

In 1736, Ward set up the Great Vitriol Works in Twickenham for producing sulphuric acid. It used a process discovered in the seventeenth century by Johann Glauber in which sulphur is burned together with saltpetre (potassium nitrate), in the presence of steam. As the saltpetre decomposes, it oxidises the sulphur to sulfur trioxide, which combines with water to produce sulphuric acid. This was the first practical production of sulphuric acid on a large scale.

Ward was in many ways quite generous to those living in poverty. He opened hospitals for the poor in Westminster as well as in the City of London and the clinics did not charge people for their service. It is estimated he gave around the sum of £3,000 to charity.

Ward is buried in Westminster Abbey.

Memorials
His statue, by his good friend Agostino Carlini, stands in the Victoria and Albert Museum.

References

External links

1685 births
1761 deaths
British chemists
British MPs 1715–1722
Members of the Parliament of Great Britain for English constituencies
Medical doctors from Yorkshire
Pseudoscientific diet advocates